The House on the Embankment is a 1976 novel by Yuri Trifonov. It is the final installment of Trifonov's cycle of Moscow novels set in the 1930s around the everyday lives of Muscovites, including the residents of the large House on the Embankment complex where Trifonov's parents had lived. The novel covers the era of the Stalinist purges, the post-war late Stalinist era, and the beginnings of stagnation.

References

1976 Russian novels
Soviet novels
Novels by Yury Trifonov